Antero Mongrut Muñoz (born 24 April 1925) was a Peruvian middle-distance runner. He competed in the men's 800 metres at the 1948 Summer Olympics.

References

External links
 

1925 births
Possibly living people
Athletes (track and field) at the 1948 Summer Olympics
Peruvian male middle-distance runners
Olympic athletes of Peru
20th-century Peruvian people